Rakočević is a Serbian surname, derived from the name Rakoč. It may refer to:
Igor Rakočević, Serbian basketball player; son of Goran Rakočević
Goran Rakočević, Serbian basketball player; father of Igor Rakočević
Darko Rakočević (born 1981), Serbian footballer
Žarko Rakočević, Montenegrin basketball player
Nikola Rakočević, Serbian actor
Verica Rakocević, Serbian fashion designer

References

External links

Serbian surnames